Exallopus is a genus of polychaetes belonging to the family Dorvilleidae.

The species of this genus are found in Northern America.

Species:

Exallopus blakei 
Exallopus cropion 
Exallopus intermedia 
Exallopus jumarsi 
Exallopus pentadiaphorus

References

Annelids